North Horsham is a civil parish in the district of Horsham in West Sussex, England, covering the northern part of the Horsham town area.  According to the 2001 census the district had a population of 21,348, increasing slightly to 21,981 at the 2011 Census.

Places within the parish include Roffey, Littlehaven, Holbrook, Old Holbrook & North Heath. Littlehaven railway station serves the parish.

References

External links

Villages in West Sussex
Horsham